Johann Sebastian Bach composed the church cantata  (It is our salvation come here to us), 9 in Leipzig for the sixth Sunday after Trinity between 1732 and 1735. It is a chorale cantata, based on the hymn "" by Paul Speratus. Bach composed the cantata to fill a gap in his chorale cantata cycle written for performances in Leipzig from 1724.

The cantata is structured in seven movements, framed as the earlier chorale cantatas by a chorale fantasia and a chorale four-part setting, of the first and the twelfth stanza in the original words by the reformer Speratus, published in the First Lutheran hymnal. The theme is salvation from sin by God's grace alone. An anonymous librettist paraphrased the content of ten inner stanzas to alternating recitatives and arias. Bach scored the cantata for a chamber ensemble of four vocal parts, flauto traverso, oboe d'amore, strings and continuo. He gave all three recitatives to the bass, like a sermon interrupted in reflection by a tenor aria with solo violin and a duet of soprano and alto with the wind instruments.

History and words 
Bach composed the cantata for the Sixth Sunday after Trinity between 1732 and 1735. It filled a gap in his second annual cycle of chorale cantatas written for performance in Leipzig. In 1724, when he composed the cycle, he had an engagement in Köthen that Sunday, and therefore left the text for later completion. The theme of the chorale is the Lutheran creed of salvation from sin by God's grace alone (justification by faith), summarized in the first stanza: "Deeds can never help, ... faith beholds Jesus Christ, ... He has become the Intercessor".

The prescribed readings for the Sunday are from the Epistle to the Romans, "By Christ's death we are dead for sin", and from the Gospel of Matthew a passage from the Sermon on the Mount about better justice than the justice of merely observing laws and rules. The  hymn in 14 stanzas matches the topic of the gospel. An unknown poet transformed the first 12 stanzas of the chorale to seven cantata movements. Dropping the last two stanzas, the librettist retains the first stanza as the first movement, and the 12th as the last movement. He rephrased stanzas 2–4 to a recitative (2), stanzas 5–7 to a recitative (4), stanzas 9–11 to a third recitative (6). Ideas from stanza 8 were made an aria (5), and movement 3 is not derived directly from the chorale, but intensifies the conclusion of the first recitative. The three recitatives can be considered a sermon, according to Julian Mincham, who comments: "All three speak of God's Laws; their bestowal, their fulfillment (or lack of it) and our attitudes towards them", and who summarizes: "The three recitatives were clearly planned as a cognate group and encapsulate the fundamental Lutheran creed. The two intervening arias, and finally the chorale, reflect upon and extend their statements." The Bach scholar Christoph Wolff assumes that the text was already written for Bach's 1724 cycle of chorale cantatas by the same librettist.

Music

Structure and scoring 
Bach structured the cantata in seven movements, framing by a chorale fantasia and a closing chorale a sequence of alternating recitatives and arias. He scored it for a chamber music ensemble of four vocal soloists (soprano (S), alto (A), tenor (T) and bass (B)), a four-part choir SATB, flauto traverso (Ft), oboe d'amore (Oa), two violins (Vl), one of them solo (Vs), viola (Va), and basso continuo (Bc). The autograph title page reads: "Dominica 6. post Trinitatis / Es ist das Heil uns kommen her / a / 4 Voci / 1 Traversa / 1 Hautb: d'Amour / 2 Violini / Viola / e / Continuo / di / Joh:Sebast:Bach".

In the following table of the movements, the scoring follows the Neue Bach-Ausgabe. The keys and time signatures are taken from Alfred Dürr, using the symbol for common time (4/4). The instruments are shown separately for winds and strings, while the continuo, playing throughout, is not shown.

Movements

1 
The opening chorus, "" (It is our salvation come here to us), is a chorale fantasia, the vocal part embedded in a concerto of the instruments. The cantus firmus of the chorale melody is in the soprano in unadorned long notes, while the lower voices engage in imitation. The scoring with the obbligato instruments flute and oboe d'amore in contrast to the strings is unusual, sometimes the first violin takes also part in the concerto.

2 
The recitatives are secco with the only exception of the final line of movement 4, "" (... embrace the arms of Jesus), which is rendered arioso, in "an enlightening major key, a tender vocal phrase and the late semi-quaver continuo line".

3 
The tenor aria depicts the "sinking" of "" (We were already too deeply sunk) in downward motifs and an irregular rhythm of syncopes, observed by Dürr as an image of "a giddy descent into the abyss of sin".

4 
The bass continues the "sermon", "" (Yet the Law must be fulfilled).

5 
The duet "" (Lord, you see, instead of good works) is set for five parts of equal weight, the soprano and alto voices, flute, oboe d'amore and continuo, in intricate canonic counterpoint in da capo form.

6 
The bass continues the "sermon" a third time, "" (When we recognize our sin against the Law).

7 
The closing chorale, "" (Although it appears that He does not will it), is set for four parts. While Bach's closing chorales are often in simple homophony, the lower voices are set here in unusual polyphony.

Recordings 

The listing is taken from the selection on the Bach Cantatas Website. Recordings have traditionally been made by large symphonic groups, but increasingly in historically informed performances (HIP) by boys' choirs, chorales (choir dedicated to mostly church music), chamber choirs or groups with on voice per part (OVPP), and matching instrumental ensembles playing on Baroque period instruments in historically informed performance. HIP and OVPPensembles are marked by green background.

References

External links 

 
 Es ist das Heil uns kommen her BWV 9; BC A 107 / Chorale cantata (6th Sunday after Trinity) Bach Digital
 BWV 9 Es ist das Heil uns kommen her English translation, University of Vermont
 Bach among the Conservatives / The Quest for Theological Truth. Thesis for the degree of Doctor of Philosophy by Rebecca Joanne Lloyd, King's College London, p. 84 (of 200)
 
 Luke Dahn: BWV 9.7 bach-chorales.com

Church cantatas by Johann Sebastian Bach
1730s works
Chorale cantatas